Ember Records may refer to:
Ember Records (UK label), established in Britain in the 1950s by Jeffrey Kruger
Ember Records (US label), established in New York by Al Silver